Sar Jameh Shuran (also Romanized as Sar Jāmeh Shūrān) is a village in Qarah Su Rural District, in the Central District of Kermanshah County, Kermanshah Province, Iran. At the 2006 census, its population was 67, in 14 families.

References 

Populated places in Kermanshah County